Deadhorse Airport  is a public airport located in Deadhorse on the North Slope of Alaska. It can be accessed from Fairbanks via the Elliott and Dalton highways. It is near Prudhoe Bay and is sometimes also called Prudhoe Airport.

Facilities and aircraft
(1,981 x 46 m) paved runway (5/23).

Deadhorse Airport, on average has 10 aircraft on the field, three single-engine aircraft, two multiengine aircraft and 5 helicopters.

For the 12-month period ending August 22, 2008, the airport had 19,710 aircraft operations, averaging 54 per day: 54% general aviation, 28% air taxi, 18% scheduled commercial and 1% military.

Airlines and destinations

Prior to its bankruptcy and cessation of all operations, Ravn Alaska served the airport from multiple locations. Wright Air Service, based in Fairbanks, Alaska, purchased Ravn's terminal and other assets and now operates across the North Slope out of that location.

The airport first opened in April 1970, and does not have a control tower. The elevation of the airport is 67.4 ft (20.5m).

Historical air service

Wien Air Alaska began serving the airport during the early 1970s with Boeing 737-200 jet service operated nonstop to both Anchorage and Fairbanks.  By 1984, Wien was operating direct, no change of plane 737 service to the lower 48 states in the U.S. on a daily basis with a routing of Prudhoe Bay - Fairbanks - Anchorage - Seattle - Oakland - Phoenix. Western Airlines briefly served Prudhoe Bay during the early 1980s with nonstop jet service to Anchorage and was the only major U.S. air carrier at the time to directly serve the airport. Alaska Airlines began serving Prudhoe Bay in December 1981 with Boeing 737-200 service to Anchorage and Fairbanks.  In 1982, Alaska Airlines was operating a multi-stop 737 service on a routing of Prudhoe Bay - Anchorage - Cordova, AK - Yakutat, AK - Juneau - Sitka, AK - Seattle. Also in 1982, Alaska Airlines and Continental Airlines were cooperating with daily no change of plane interchange jet service from the lower 48 states flying a routing of Tulsa - Wichita - Denver - Portland, OR  - Anchorage - Fairbanks - Prudhoe Bay.  By 1985, MarkAir was operating nonstop Boeing 737-200 service to Anchorage, Fairbanks and Barrow, AK.

Statistics

References

External links

 FAA Alaska airport diagram (GIF)

Airports in North Slope Borough, Alaska